Skandinavisk Aero Industri A/S (abbreviated SAI; English: Scandinavian Aero Industries) was a Danish manufacturer of aeroplanes that existed between 1937 and 1954. The company was founded by technician Viggo Kramme (1905–1984) and engineer Karl Gustav Zeuthen (1909–1989) and based in Copenhagen.

The company's aeroplanes were labelled "KZ" for Kramme and Zeuthen, the first being the KZ I from 1937. The KZ IV was built as an ambulance plane for Zone-Redningskorpset and introduced in 1944. Post-war sales never reached the company's expectations, and production turned unprofitable in the early 1950s, driving the company to shut down. In total, about 200 planes were built by the company.

A number of the KZ planes have been preserved. As of 2005, Dansk Veteranflysamling (The Danish Collection of Vintage Aircraft) exhibits a specimen of each of the 11 aircraft models manufactured by the company.

Aircraft

References

External links 

 History of The Danish Collection of Vintage Aircraft and the KZ planes
 List of aeroplanes at The Danish Collection of Vintage Aircraft
 Skandinavisk Aero Industri and the KZ planes (in Danish) from The Danish Collection of Vintage Aircraft
 The KZ & Vintage Aircraft Club
 About the KZ IV planes (in Danish) from The Danish Aviation Historical Society

Aviation in Denmark
Defunct aircraft manufacturers of Denmark
Manufacturing companies based in Copenhagen
Danish companies established in 1937
Manufacturing companies established in 1937
Technology companies established in 1937
Manufacturing companies disestablished in 1954